GM Sugar Uganda Limited, also GM Sugar Limited or GM Sugar, is a manufacturer of sugar in Uganda.

Location
The coordinates of the company headquarters are 0°24'43.0"N, 33°08'10.0"E (Latitude:0.411939; Longitude:33.136106).

Overview
GM Sugar Uganda  Limited was established in 2006. The company is a member of the Millers Association of Sugarcane, an industry group of sugar manufacturers in Uganda.

See also
List of sugar manufacturers in Uganda

References

External links
GM Sugar welcomes Mayuge Sugar

Buikwe District
Sugar companies of Uganda
Companies established in 2006
2006 establishments in Uganda
Agriculture in Uganda